John Bailey Gage (February 24, 1887 – January 15, 1970) was an American attorney who served as mayor of Kansas City, Missouri from 1940 to 1946. He made reforms following the collapse of the political machine of Thomas Pendergast.

Biography
Gage was born on the  family farm at 9th and Cleveland on February 24, 1887.  He graduated from the University of Kansas in 1907.  Following in his father's footsteps, he studied law and received his law degree from the Kansas City School of Law in 1909.

He married Constant R. Lane in 1916, and they had one child. His wife died in January 1920.

In 1930, he started the Gage and Hill law firm in the Bryant Building at 11th and Grand.  Following a series of mergers, the firm would become Lathrop and Gage in 1873 (via the Lathrop line).

After Pendergast pleaded guilty to income tax evasion charges in 1939, Gage, a Democrat, campaigned for mayor for the Citizens Association party consisting of both Democrats and Republicans.  A signature aspect of the campaign was an appeal to housewives with the slogan:

He was to cut the city budget by $700,000, hired city manager L.P. Cookingham, and began to expand the city limits.  He was elected three times.

He died on January 15, 1970, a month after being hit by a truck while walking to work at 11th and Grand Avenue in Kansas City.

References

Kansas City Star biography
Kansas City Public Library biography
The Great Plains States of America: People, Politics, and Power in the Nine Great Plains States By Neal R. Peirce, Neal R. Peirce 

1887 births
1970 deaths
University of Kansas alumni
Missouri Democrats
Mayors of Kansas City, Missouri
Pedestrian road incident deaths
Road incident deaths in Missouri
20th-century American politicians